Dennis Therrell (born August 30, 1956) is an American football coach and former player. He served as the head football coach at Lock Haven University of Pennsylvania from 1990 to 1995, compiling a record of 14–51–1. Therrell played collegiately as a linebacker at Tennessee Tech during the mid-1970s.

Coaching career 
Therrell began his coaching career at the high school level, serving for one year at Campbell County High School (1979) and three seasons at Rhea County High School (1980–1982) in Tennessee. He made his first entry into major college football as a graduate assistant coach at the University of Tennessee. In 1985, he became an assistant football coach for Middle Tennessee State University, coaching the Blue Raiders defensive ends until 1987. He then served as the defensive coordinator for Division-II member Lock Haven University for three years (1987–1989), before becoming the school's head coach in 1990.

In 1996, Therrell joined Todd Berry's coaching staff at Illinois State University as the defensive coordinator. He helped to lead the Redbirds to the 1999 NCAA Division I-AA semifinals. Following the 1999 campaign, Therrell followed Berry to the United States Military Academy, where he served as the defensive coordinator for four seasons (2000–2003).

He then was the defensive coordinator for Murray State University from 2004 to 2005. The Murray State Racers football team defense was ranked fourth. Subsequently, Therrell had a three-year stint at UNLV from 2007 to 2009, serving as the Rebels defensive coordinator the last two seasons. He also coached the safeties in 2009, after spending his first two seasons mentoring the linebackers.

After coaching three seasons in the professional ranks with the Las Vegas Locomotives of the United Football League (UFL), Therrell returned to Murray State as defensive coordinator in 2013.

Therrell served as head coach at his alma mater, Bledsoe County High School, during the fall of 2017, leading the Warriors to a 4–7 record. He resigned in July 2018.

Head coaching record

References

1956 births
Living people
Army Black Knights football coaches
Auburn Tigers football coaches
High school football coaches in Tennessee
Illinois State Redbirds football coaches
Las Vegas Locomotives coaches
Lock Haven Bald Eagles football coaches
Middle Tennessee Blue Raiders football coaches
Murray State Racers football coaches
People from Pikeville, Tennessee
Tennessee Tech Golden Eagles football players
Tennessee Volunteers football coaches
University of Tennessee alumni
UNLV Rebels football coaches